Silent Love (stylized as SILENT L♥️VE) is the second mini album by Japanese singer Akina Nakamori. It was released on 21 December 1984 under the Warner Pioneer label. The concept of the album is short story about characters, Dan and Rei who meet on the Christmas Eve on 25 December.

Background
Silent Love is the third album to be released in 1984 and first mini album release for the first time in two years. The album doesn't include any single songs and are full new 4 recorded tracks.

The music production team consist of arranger Ichizou Seo, lyricist Shizuka Ijūin and composer Daisuke Inoue.

Stage performances
On the Fuji TV music television program Yoru no Hit Studio, Akina performed Terminal made no Eve.

Chart performance
The album reached number two on the Oricon Album Weekly Chart, charted 16 weeks and selling over 282,000 copies.

Track listing
All lyrics by Shizuka Ijuin; all music by Daisuke Inoue; all arrangements by Ichizou Seo.

References

1984 EPs
Akina Nakamori albums
Warner Music Japan EPs
Christmas EPs
Concept albums
Japanese-language EPs